The 2016 Americas Rugby Championship was the first series of the Americas Rugby Championship (sometimes informally called the "Americas Six Nations", a reference to Europe's Six Nations Championship), a new annual western hemisphere rugby union championship. It was contested by Argentina XV (Argentina's secondary national team), Canada, United States, Uruguay, Brazil, and Chile. All matches will be full international test matches with caps awarded, including for Argentina XV players and their opponents, but Argentina XV matches will not count to World Rankings for either team.

Participants

Table

Squads

Fixtures
The tournament will be played in a round-robin format, with each team playing the five others once.

Week One

Notes:
 Daniel Sancery and Felipe Sancery made their international debuts for Brazil.
 Rodrigo Moya and Beltrán Vergara made their international debuts for Chile.

Notes:
 Gradyn Bowd, Paul Ciulini, Alistair Clark, Dan Moor, Clay Panga, Lucas Rumball and Mozac Samson made their international debuts for Canada.
 Santiago Arata, Facundo Gattas and Gonzalo Soto made their international debuts for Uruguay.

Week Two

Notes:
 Lukas Lacoste, Ignacio Secco and Martín Secco made their international debuts for Uruguay.

Notes:
 Nate Brakeley, James Hilterbrand, Mike Sosene-Feagai, Ben Landry, Brodie Orth, David Tameilau, Alec Gletzer, James Bird, JP Eloff, Mike Te'o, Lemoto Filikitonga, Mike Garrity, Kingsley McGowan and Jake Anderson all made their international debuts for the United States.
 Kyle Baillie, Liam Chisholm, Andrew Ferguson and Duncan Maguire made their international debuts for Canada.

Week Three

Notes:
 Demecus Beach, Pat Blair, Tom Bliss, Nick Edwards, Ryan Matyas and Lorenzo Thomas made their international debuts for the United States.
 Tomás Dussaillant, Humberto Chacaltana and Ińaki Gurruchaga made their international debuts for Chile.

Notes:
 This was the first time that these two teams played each other.
 Rob Brouwer, Brock Staller, Michael Hamson, Joe Dolesau, Eric Howard, Brett Johnson and Jacob Robinson made their international debuts for Canada.

Week Four

Notes:
 Rafael Mones made his international debut for Uruguay.

Notes:
 This was the first meeting between these two teams.
 This was Brazil's first ever victory over a Tier 2 nation.
 André Arruda made his international debut for Brazil.
 Hanco Germishuys, James King and Aladdin Schirmer made their international debuts for the United States.

Week Five

Notes:
 Deion Mikesell made his international debut for the United States.
 This was Uruguay's first victory over the United States since their 10–9 victory in 2002.

Notes:
 Ryan Kotlewski made his international debut for Canada.

Statistics

Points scorers

Try scorers

Notes

References

External links

2016
2016 rugby union tournaments for national teams
2016 in Canadian rugby union
rugby union
rugby union
rugby union
2016 in American rugby union
2016 in Argentine rugby union
2016 in North American rugby union
2016 in South American rugby union